Ballynahatty may refer to:

Ballynahatty, County Down, Northern Ireland
Ballynahatty, County Tyrone, in County Tyrone, Northern Ireland
Ballynahatty woman